Jaroslav Zelený (born 20 August 1992) is a Czech football player who currently plays for Sparta Prague.

Career statistics

International

References

 Profile at iDNES.cz (Czech)

External links
 Profile at ČMFS website
 Guardian Football
 

1992 births
Living people
Czech footballers
FC Hradec Králové players
MFK Karviná players
Czech National Football League players
FK Jablonec players
SK Slavia Prague players
FK Mladá Boleslav players
Czech First League players
Association football defenders
Czech Republic international footballers
Czech Republic youth international footballers
Sportspeople from Hradec Králové
AC Sparta Prague players